Bananas is a 1971 American comedy film directed by Woody Allen and starring Allen, Louise Lasser, and Carlos Montalban. Written by Allen and Mickey Rose, the film is about a bumbling New Yorker who, after being dumped by his activist girlfriend, travels to a tiny Latin American nation and becomes involved in its latest rebellion. Parts of the plot are based on the book Don Quixote, U.S.A. by Richard P. Powell.

Filmed on location in New York City and Puerto Rico, the film was released to positive reviews from critics and was number 78 on Bravo's "100 Funniest Movies" and number 69 on AFI's 100 Years...100 Laughs in 2000.

Plot
The film opens on Howard Cosell's coverage of the assassination of the president of the fictional "banana republic" of San Marcos and a coup d'état that brings Gen. Emilio Molina Vargas to power.

Fielding Mellish is a neurotic blue collar man who tries to impress social activist Nancy by trying to get in touch with the revolution in San Marcos. He visits the republic and attempts to show his concern for the native people. However, Vargas secretly orders his men, disguised as Vargas's opponents, to kill Mellish, to make the rebels look bad so that the U.S. will send Vargas financial aid. Mellish evades Vargas's assassins, but is shortly after captured by the real rebels. Vargas declares Mellish dead regardless, leaving Mellish no choice but to join the rebels for two months. Mellish then learns, clumsily, how to be a revolutionary. When the revolution is successful, Esposito, the Castro-style leader, goes mad. The rebels decide to replace him with Mellish as their president.

When traveling back to the U.S. to obtain financial aid, Mellish (sporting a long fake beard) reunites with Nancy and is exposed. In court, Mellish tries to defend himself from a series of incriminating witnesses, including a reigning Miss America and a middle-aged African-American woman claiming to be J. Edgar Hoover in disguise. One of the witnesses does provide testimony favorable to Mellish, but the court clerk, when asked to read back this testimony, replies with an entirely different, wholly unfavorable rendition. Mellish is eventually sentenced to prison, but his sentence is suspended on the condition that he does not move into the judge's neighborhood. Nancy then agrees to marry him. The film ends with Howard Cosell's coverage of the between-the-covers consummation of their marriage, an event that was over much more quickly than Nancy had anticipated, with Mellish anticipating a rematch in the early spring.

Cast

 Woody Allen as Fielding Mellish
 Louise Lasser as Nancy
 Carlos Montalban as Gen. Emilio Molina Vargas
 Natividad Abascal as Yolanda
 Howard Cosell as himself
 Jacobo Morales as Esposito
 Miguel Ángel Suárez as Luis
 David Ortiz as Sanchez
 René Enríquez as Diaz
 Jack Axelrod as Arroyo
 Roger Grimsby as himself
 Don Dunphy as himself
 Martha Greenhouse as Dr. Feigen
 Dan Frazer as Priest
 Stanley Ackerman as Dr. Mellish
 Charlotte Rae as Mrs. Mellish
 Axel Anderson as man Tortured

Eddie Barth and Nicholas Saunders make their theatrical film debuts as the characters Paul and Douglas, while comedian Conrad Bain plays Semple and actor Allen Garfield plays the Man on Cross. Uncredited appearances include Sylvester Stallone as a subway thug #1 , Mary Jo Catlett as a woman in a hotel lobby, and Tino García in an undisclosed role.

Production

Development
According to an interview in the notes of the film's DVD release, Allen said that there is absolutely no blood in the film (even during executions) because he wanted to keep the light comedic tone of the film intact.

Allen and Lasser had been married from 1966 to 1970 and were divorced at the time the film was made.

The verdict in Mellish's legal case is portrayed as the headline story of a Roger Grimsby newscast. Included in the scene is a parody television advertisement for New Testament cigarettes with a Catholic priest (Dan Frazer) promoting the fictitious brand while performing the sacrament of the Eucharist. The movie received a C (condemned) classification from the National Catholic Office for Motion Pictures because of the spoof.

Title
The title is a pun, "bananas" being slang for "crazy", as well as being a reference to the phrase "banana republic" describing the film's setting. When Allen was asked why the film was called Bananas, his reply was, "Because there are no bananas in it." Some writers have made the connection between this and The Cocoanuts, the first film by the Marx Brothers, by whom Allen was heavily influenced at the time, and which featured no coconuts.

Music
 Quiero la Noche, words and music by Marvin Hamlisch
 Cause I Believe in Loving, music by Marvin Hamlisch, lyrics by Howard Liebling, sung by Jake Holmes
 1812 Overture in E Flat, Op.49 (1880), written by Pyotr Ilyich Tchaikovsky
 Naughty Marietta (1910), music by Victor Herbert

Reception

Critical response
Bananas was well received by critics; receiving an 83% rating on Rotten Tomatoes based on 35 reviews with an average rating of 7.5/10.

Vincent Canby of The New York Times praised the film, saying "Allen's view of the world is fraught with everything except pathos, and it's a view I happen to find very funny. Here is no little man surviving with a wan smile and a shrug, but a runty, wise-mouthed guy whose initial impulses toward cowardice seem really heroic in the crazy order of the way things are."  He concluded, "Any movie that attempts to mix together love, Cuban revolution, the C.I.A., Jewish mothers, J. Edgar Hoover and a few other odds and ends (including a sequence in which someone orders 1,000 grilled cheese sandwiches) is bound to be a little weird—and most welcome." Gene Siskel of the Chicago Tribune gave the film three stars out of four and called the opening scene "one of the funniest bits of film," though he thought the romance "gets in the way" and "could have been omitted easily." Charles Champlin of the Los Angeles Times wrote that "Allen seems to have been unable to figure a suitable finish for the plot, which does not so much peak as stop. Still the best jokes have a glorious insanity about them. Given the diminishing ability to laugh like blazing idiots these days, 'Bananas' is welcome even if Allen is not quite at the top of his form." Gary Arnold of The Washington Post wrote that the film was "in a word, hilarious," and "an immense improvement" over Take the Money and Run. Richard Combs of The Monthly Film Bulletin thought that "the gags seem a little brighter than in Take the Money," but also found the scattershot humor "too undisciplined and disparate." John Simon wrote of the film's plot "None of it makes for sense or solidly developing humor, and much of it is in bad taste".

Accolades
The film is recognized by American Film Institute in these lists:
 2000: AFI's 100 Years...100 Laughs – #69

References

External links

 
 
 
 
 

1971 films
1970s screwball comedy films
1970s political comedy films
American political comedy films
American political satire films
American screwball comedy films
American LGBT-related films
1970s English-language films
Films scored by Marvin Hamlisch
Films directed by Woody Allen
Films set in South America
Films set in New York City
Films set in a fictional country
Films shot in New York City
Films shot in Peru
Films shot in Puerto Rico
United Artists films
Films about Latin American military dictatorships
Films with screenplays by Woody Allen
1971 LGBT-related films
1971 comedy films
1970s American films